Tunkhannock Area School District is a midsized rural/suburban public school district serving most of Wyoming County in northeast Pennsylvania in the United States. According to 2010 federal census data, Tunkhannock Area School District served a resident population of 28,276. By 2010, the district's population declined sharply to 19,032 people. In 2009, the district residents’ per capita income was $18,112, while the median family income was $44,626. In the Commonwealth, the median family income was $49,501 and the United States median family income was $49,445, in 2010.

Tunkhannock Area School District operates six schools - Roslund Elementary in Tunkhannock, Mehoopany Elementary in Mehoopany Township, Mill City Elementary in Dalton, PA, Evans Falls Elementary in Monroe Township, the Tunkhannock Area Middle School in Tunkhannock, and the Tunkhannock Area High School in Tunkhannock. The school mascot is the Tiger.

Extracurriculars
Tunkhannock Area School District offers a wide variety of clubs, activities and an extensive sports program.

Sports
The district funds:

Boys
Baseball - AAA
Basketball- AAA
Cross country - AA
Football - AAA
Golf - AAA
Lacrosse - AAAA
Soccer - AA
Swimming and diving - AA
Tennis - AA
Track and Field - AAA
Volleyball - AA
Wrestling	- AAA

Girls
Basketball - AAA
Cross country - AA
Field hockey - AA
Golf - AAA
Lacrosse - AAAA
Soccer (fall) - AA
Softball - AAA
Swimming and diving - AA
Girls' tennis - AA
Track and field - AAA
Volleyball - AA

Middle School Sports

Boys
Baseball
Basketball
Cross country
Football
Soccer
Track and field
Wrestling	

Girls
Basketball
Cross country
Field hockey
Soccer (fall)
Softball 
Track and field

According to PIAA directory July 2013

See also 
 Miller v. Skumanick

References

External links 
 
 http://www.greatschools.net/cgi-bin/pa/district_profile/497

School districts in Wyoming County, Pennsylvania